Christopher Edward Sedgwick (born 28 April 1980) is an English former professional footballer who played as a midfielder. He was last employed as a coach at Bury, the club with whom he spent the final three years of his playing career.

Career

Rotherham United
Born in Sheffield, Sedgwick began his career as a right midfielder at Rotherham United, where he was affectionately known as the Yorkshire Express, and made over 250 first team appearances in a seven-year stint at the Yorkshire club. During that time he earned a reputation as an honest hard-working right-midfielder with good distribution skills. He was often regarded as the talisman of the club because of his Sheffield upbringing and passion for the club.

Preston North End
He signed for Preston North End for £400,000 in November 2004. At Preston, Sedgwick started to fulfill his potential as a right midfielder under Billy Davies and was an integral part of the side that would reach the playoff final in May 2005 and semi-finals in 2006. The departure of Davies in the summer of 2006 affected the certainty of Sedgwick's place in the team and he lost his place in the starting XI to Simon Whaley as new manager Paul Simpson took charge. At the beginning of the 2006–07 season, Sedgwick was asked to play in central midfield, a new position for the winger, as cover for Brian O'Neil who was struggling with injury before being forced to retire. There he formed a partnership with Paul McKenna as Simpson's side picked up where Billy Davies left off, ending 2006 top of the 1st Division before finishing the season in 7th, a point off the playoffs.

Preston's poor start to the 2007/8 season and Whaley's indifferent form saw Sedgwick in and out of the Preston side until Simpson was dismissed in November 2007. Under Simpson's replacement Alan Irvine, Sedgwick's undeniable work ethic saw him one of the first names on Irvine's team sheet as Preston survived relegation in 2008 and again reached the playoff semi-finals in 2009.

However, when Irvine was replaced in December 2009 by Darren Ferguson and Preston's form worsened in the second half of the 2009/10 season, Sedgwick found himself in and out of the side before being dropped from the matchday squad completely as Preston narrowly avoided relegation. At the end of the season Ferguson announced that he would not be extending Sedgwick's contract at the club as he was surplus to requirements.

Sheffield Wednesday
On 7 June 2010 Sedgwick was reunited with Alan Irvine's as he became Sheffield Wednesday's first summer of the 2010–11 pre-season. After playing forty-three times for the club in the league, scoring five goals, Sedgwick was amongst the six first-team players to be released after being a part of Sheffield Wednesday's promotion squad that took them up to the Football League Championship.

Scunthorpe United and Hyde
On 3 November 2012, Scunthorpe United boss Brian Laws confirmed that he had signed for the club on non-contract terms. But after three appearances he was sent out on a two-month loan to Conference National side Hyde. He made his debut for the club in a 3–1 win at Newport County. He scored his first goal in Hyde's 2–0 Boxing Day win away at Stockport County. On 22 January 2013, he signed for Hyde on a permanent basis. He made another thirteen appearances in 2012–13 without scoring, and was released at the end of the season.

Bury
On 10 July 2013, Sedgwick signed a one-year contract with League Two club Bury. In June 2015, Chris Brass was promoted to Head of Football Operations, First Team Coach Ben Futcher was promoted to Assistant Manager and Sedgwick filled the position left by Futcher as Player-Coach.

Career statistics

A.  The "League" column constitutes appearances and goals (including substitutes) in Championship, League One and League Two.
B.  The "Other" column constitutes appearances and goals (including substitutes) in the Football League play-offs and the Football League Trophy.

Honours
Sheffield Wednesday
Football League One runners-up: 2011–12

References

External links

1980 births
Living people
Footballers from Sheffield
English footballers
Association football midfielders
Rotherham United F.C. players
Preston North End F.C. players
Sheffield Wednesday F.C. players
Scunthorpe United F.C. players
Hyde United F.C. players
Bury F.C. players
English Football League players
National League (English football) players
Bury F.C. non-playing staff